Johan Ragnar Falck (23 July 1905 – 25 March 1966) was a Swedish stage and film actor. He also directed two films in 1944.

He was married to the actress Britta Brunius.

Selected filmography
 The Two of Us (1930)
 International Match (1932)
 A Stolen Waltz (1932)
 Shipwrecked Max (1936)
 Sun Over Sweden (1938)
 Hanna in Society (1940)
 Blossom Time (1940)
 Bashful Anton (1940)
 Life Goes On (1941)
 Första divisionen (1941)
 En dag skall gry (1944)
 Barnen från Frostmofjället (1945)
Widower Jarl (1945)
 Harald the Stalwart (1946)
 Only a Mother (1949)
 The Nuthouse (1951)
 Tarps Elin (1956)
 Laila (1958)
 The Wedding Day (1960)

References

Bibliography 
 Goble, Alan. The Complete Index to Literary Sources in Film. Walter de Gruyter, 1999.

External links 
 

1905 births
1966 deaths
Swedish male film actors
Swedish male silent film actors
Swedish male stage actors
Swedish film directors
20th-century Swedish male actors
Male actors from Stockholm